A gas thermometer is a thermometer that measures temperature by the variation in volume or pressure of a gas.

Volume Thermometer
This thermometer functions by Charles's Law. Charles's Law states that when the temperature of a gas increases, so does the volume. 

Using Charles's Law, the temperature can be measured by knowing  the volume of gas at a certain temperature by using the formula, written below. Translating it to the correct levels of the device that is holding the gas. This works on the same principle as mercury thermometers. 

or

 is the volume,

 is the thermodynamic temperature,

 is the constant for the system. 

 is not a fixed constant across all systems and therefore needs to be found experimentally for a given system through testing with known temperature values.

Pressure Thermometer and Absolute Zero

The constant volume gas thermometer plays a crucial role in understanding how absolute zero could be discovered long before the advent of cryogenics.  Consider a graph of pressure versus temperature made not far from standard conditions (well above absolute zero) for three different samples of any ideal gas (a, b, c). To the extent that the gas is ideal, the pressure depends linearly on temperature, and the extrapolation to zero pressure occurs at absolute zero. Note that data could have been collected with three different amounts of the same gas, which would have rendered this experiment easy to do in the eighteenth century.

History

See also 
 Thermodynamic instruments
 Boyle's law
 Combined gas law
 Gay-Lussac's law
 Avogadro's law
 Ideal gas law

References

Thermometers
Gases

fr:Thermomètre#Thermomètre à gaz